Jamie Brian Grassi (born 9 October 1998) is an Irish cricketer who represents the Italy national cricket team. Grassi's father is Italian, and he qualified to play for Italy in 2021, after his three-year exclusion period had expired.

Grassi made his List A debut for Leinster Lightning in the 2017 Inter-Provincial Cup on 1 May 2017. He made his Twenty20 cricket debut for Munster Reds in the 2017 Inter-Provincial Trophy on 26 May 2017. In December 2017, he was named in Ireland's squad for the 2018 Under-19 Cricket World Cup.

In September 2021, he was named in Italy's Twenty20 International (T20I) squad for the Regional Final of the 2021 ICC Men's T20 World Cup Europe Qualifier tournament. He made his T20I debut on 15 October 2021, for Italy against Denmark.

References

External links
 

1998 births
Living people
Irish cricketers
Italian cricketers
Italy Twenty20 International cricketers
Leinster Lightning cricketers
Munster Reds cricketers
Cricketers from Dublin (city)
Wicket-keepers